Nava Telangana Party (NTPP) was a political party in Andhra Pradesh, India. The party was founded by Tulla Devender Goud to achieve separate statehood for Telangana. The party argued that the people of Telangana were being treated as second class citizens, due to a lack of drinking water despite having two major rivers (Krishna and Godavari) flowing through the region.

NTPP intended to contest the 2009 Andhra Pradesh assembly election in all constituencies of the Telangana districts along with like-minded parties, with the objective of creating an independent Telangana state.

History 
Goud announced the new party on 11 July 2008 in Hyderabad, along with its flag and logo. The flag consisted of a map of Telangana state surrounded by the colour blue, to represent the state's rivers as well as the Indian roller bird. The inside of the state was brown, representing the earth or land, and contained a plough, spade, book, and torch in the centre to symbolize youth, farmers, workers, and students.

The party's head office was opened on 14 August 2008 by Fatima Begum, mother of Shaik Fakir, belonging to warangal, who died protesting for Telangana statehood in 1968 at the age of 19, along with Venkamma, mother of Narsimlu, who was shot by police at the age of 14 during a similar protest.

Merger 
On 26 February 2009, Goud announced that NTP was merging with the Praja Rajyam Party, for financial reasons. He reversed this decision and merged his party with the Telugu Desam Party on 3 August 2009. Commenting on this decision, Goud said the merger was a suggestion from among his supporters.

References

External links

http://in.news.yahoo.com/32/20080712/1054/tnl-goud-launches-telangana-party.html
http://www.global-report.com/india/?l=en&a=323383
http://www.telanganaonline.com/viewnews.aspx?Id=127
http://timesofindia.indiatimes.com/articleshow/msid-3220584,prtpage-1.cms
http://www.goudsinfo.com/News-TDG.htm
http://www.navatelanganaprajaparty.com

Political parties in Telangana
Political parties established in 2008
Defunct political parties in Telangana
2008 establishments in Andhra Pradesh
Political parties disestablished in 2009